1 Cassiopeiae is a single star in the northern constellation of Cassiopeia, located around 1,130 light years from the Sun. It is visible to the naked eye as a faint, blue-white hued star with an apparent visual magnitude of +4.84. This object is moving closer to the Earth with a heliocentric radial velocity of −9 km/s.

The stellar classification of 1 Cassiopeiae is B0.5 III, matching an evolved B-type giant star. It is 5.7 million years old with a projected rotational velocity of 31. The star has 13.1 times the mass of the Sun and 10.2 times the Sun's radius. It is radiating 18,200 times the Sun's luminosity from its photosphere at an effective temperature of 27,200 K.

References

B-type giants
Cassiopeia (constellation)
BD+58 2545
Cassiopeiae, 01
218376
114104
8797